Everything I Never Told You is the 2014 debut novel by Celeste Ng. The novel topped Amazon's Best Books of the Year list for 2014. The novel is about a mixed-race Chinese-American family whose middle daughter Lydia is found drowned in a nearby lake. Ng spent six years writing the novel, going through four different full drafts.

Plot
On May 3, 1977, Lydia Lee, the middle child of the Lee family, is missing. After several days, her body is dredged out of the town lake. Lydia's parents, James and Marilyn, are horrified by their daughter's death. As the police investigate, her parents discover that, contrary to their belief that Lydia was popular and doing well in school, she was actually very lonely with almost no friends and that her grades had severely slipped.

The death of Lydia leads James and Marilyn to reflect on their lives. James, the academically gifted child of Chinese immigrants, spent his life yearning to belong. He met Marilyn in 1957 when he was a doctoral candidate at Harvard teaching a class on American culture in which she was a student. After graduation, James failed to secure a faculty position at Harvard, so he accepted an offer from the fictional Middlewood College in Ohio. Marilyn grew up disgusted by her homemaker mother (who taught home economics at her high school) and longed to become a doctor. When she met James and recognized the racist treatment he had been enduring, Marilyn felt a kinship with him and the two began a relationship. Discovering she was pregnant, Marilyn arranged for a quick marriage to James and was angry when her mother tried to stop the wedding after seeing that James was of Asian descent.

Marilyn intended to resume her studies to become a doctor after her son, Nathan, was born, but after her second pregnancy, with Lydia, she remained a homemaker for eight years. Upon receiving news of her estranged mother's death, Marilyn returns to her childhood home in Virginia to deal with her mother's possessions. While doing so, she realizes that she became a homemaker, as her mother had always desired. Marilyn then abandons her family to pursue her academic studies. James believes that she has left because he and the children are Asian, and that she no longer wants to deal with the societal pressure of being outsiders.

Marilyn's absence lasts nine weeks, during which time she discovers that she is pregnant with a third child, Hannah. She returns home and realizes that she will never have the will to abandon her children and pursue a career again. Instead, Marilyn encourages Lydia to become a doctor, aggressively training her in math and science. During Marilyn's absence, James began favoring Lydia and bullying Nathan, whom James perceives to be as friendless as James was in childhood. Because of this, Nathan becomes jealous of Lydia and one day pushes her into the lake even though she cannot swim. However, the ease with which she falls causes Nathan to realize that Lydia is drowning under the weight of her parents' expectations. He rescues her and then the two become close.

By the time they are teenagers, Lydia begins buckling under the weight of her mother's expectations and cannot keep up with the advanced math and science courses her mother encourages her to take. She also is tired of pretending that she has friends in order to assuage her father. Lydia begins to hang out with Jack, a next door neighbor whom Nathan hates, and who has a reputation for deflowering town girls.

Meanwhile, Nathan, who has spent the past few years being ignored by his parents, is accepted into Harvard. Lydia is scared of being abandoned by Nathan and hides his acceptance letter. When she is caught, a rift develops between the siblings. Lydia goes to Jack, hoping to have sex with him, but Jack confesses that he is in love with Nathan, and that his reputation as a Lothario is a pretense. Returning home, Lydia is determined to reveal her shortcomings to her father and mother. Tracing her unhappiness to the time her brother pushed her into the lake, Lydia goes there late at night intending to jump into the water and swim back to shore. However, Lydia drowns instead; it is suggested that her death was not a suicide as posited previously, but probably an accidental death. 

In the present, Marilyn discovers that after Lydia's death, James has begun an affair with one of his graduate students, Louisa Chen, who is also of Chinese descent. Marilyn learns that James believes that she resents their marriage because he and the children are not white. James leaves Marilyn. However, James and Marilyn slowly begin to reconnect when he returns.

Nathan, who still believes that Jack is responsible for Lydia's death, confronts him by the lake, punching him twice before Hannah, who has realized that Jack is in love with Nathan, stops him. Nathan falls into the lake, where he realizes that he will never understand Lydia's death and achieves a modicum of closure. He is helped out of the lake by Jack.

Awards
The novel won the Amazon Book of the Year Award in 2014, beating out works by Stephen King and Hilary Mantel. It also received the 2015 Massachusetts Book Award, the American Library Association's 2015 Alex Award, the Asian/Pacific Librarians Association Award for Literature (Adult Fiction), and the Medici Book Club Prize, and was a finalist for the Ohioana Book Awards, The John Creasy/New Blood Dagger Award. and the VCU/Cabell First Novelist Award.

Critical reception 
According to the review aggregator website Bookmarks Everything I Never Told You received rave reviews. Writing for The New York Times, Alexander Chee described the novel as "a deep, heartfelt portrait of a family struggling with its place in history, and a young woman hoping to be the fulfillment of that struggle." Similarly Mark Lawson of The Guardian praised the author's debut novel, writing "Ng brilliantly depicts the destruction that parents can inflict on their children and on each other." The review concludes with Lawson noting, "Everything I Never Told You ranks with acute novels of family psycho-pathology such as Jane Hamilton's A Map of the World and Laura Lippman's What the Dead Know." Kirkus Reviews noted "Ng's emotionally complex debut novel sucks you in like a strong current and holds you fast until its final secrets surface."

Live-action adaptation 
The book's rights were optioned by LD Entertainment. Oscar-nominated producer Michael De Luca was attached to produce with Julia Cox attached to adapt the screenplay. In December 2018, Julia Roberts was attached to play the lead female role by the book's author.

In May 2020, LD Entertainment's option had expired. Annapurna TV bought the rights to Ng's debut novel and is planning to produce alongside A-Major and will produce it as a limited series instead. Megan Ellison, Sue Naegle, Patrick Chu, and Ali Krug will executive produce the project for Annapurna while Mary Lee will executive produce for A-Major.

References

External links

2014 American novels
English-language novels
Novels set in the 1970s
Novels set in Ohio
Penguin Press books
Literature by Chinese-American women
Novels by Celeste Ng
2014 debut novels